The Fédération des éclaireuses et éclaireurs (FEE, Guides and Scouts Federation) is an umbrella federation of about 15 regional Scouting and Guiding associations in France. It was founded in 1989 and serves about 2000 members. The FEE is a member of the Conférence Française de Scoutisme.

History
The FEE was founded by five local groups in 1989, all of them former members of the Eclaireuses et Eclaireurs de France (EEdF); the following year, they were joint by four formerly independent associations. In 1992, it received the public agreement which is necessary in France for all youth organizations. The FEE was among the founding members of the Conférence Française de Scoutisme in 2000.

Component associations
The sources on the component associations differ and name between 12 and 19 member associations. Among the associations named are:

 Association de Scoutisme unioniste
 Association vairoise de Scoutisme laïque
 Eclaireurs du Midi
 Eclaireurs et Louvetaux orthodoxes
 Eclaireurs neutres du Limousin
 Eclaireuses et Eclaireurs alpins
 Eclaireuses et Eclaireurs Baden-Powell
 Eclaireuses et Eclaireurs Côte d'Opale
 Eclaireuses et Eclaireurs d'Armor
 Eclaireuses et Eclaireurs de Cognac
 Eclaireuses et Eclaireurs de Melun
 Eclaireuses et Eclaireurs de Vichy
 Eclaireuses et Eclaireurs de Seine-Saint-Denis
 Eclaireuses et Eclaireurs laïques
 Groupe Pierre Dejean
 Groupe Pierre François
 Scoutisme en Dombes
 Scoutisme unioniste Montalbanais
 Scoutisme unioniste Toulousain
 Scoutisme unitaire chrétien
 Scouts orthodoxes de France
 Scouts pluralistes de France

 Former members
 Association française de Scoutisme unioniste; its components Scoutisme unioniste Montalbanais, Scoutisme unioniste Toulousain and Association de Scoutisme unioniste remained in the FEE as separate members after the disbandment of the AFSU.
 Eclaireuses et Eclaireurs Bois-Colombes (founding member of the FEE; returned to the EEdF in 2000)
 Eclaireuses et Eclaireurs de Gascogne
 Eclaireuses et Eclaireurs Sud Seine-et-Marne

Program
The FEE as a whole is a non-denominational Scouting organization, but its component associations a free to choose a confessional sponsor. The associations works in three age-groups:
 Louvetaux/Louvettes (Cub Scouts) - ages 8 to 11
 Eclaireurs/Eclaireuse (Scouts/Guides) - ages 12 to 16
 Routiers/Aînées (Rover Scouts/Ranger Guides) - ages 17 and older

References

External links
 Official website 

Scouting and Guiding in France
Non-aligned Scouting organizations
Youth organizations established in 1989